Gurbansoltan Eje District (formerly Yylanly District) was until 2022 a district of Daşoguz Province in Turkmenistan. The district was named after Gurbansoltan Eje, former president Saparmurat Niyazov's mother. On 9 November 2022 by decree of the Turkmen parliament the district was abolished and its territory transferred to Akdepe District.

References

Daşoguz Region